The South Australian PGA Championship was a professional golf tournament played in South Australia. It was first held in 1927.

History
The first South Australian Professional Championship was held in 1927 and was a 72-hole stroke-play event. It was won by Rufus Stewart, four ahead of Fergus McMahon. Stewart had recently won the Australian Open. McMahon won in 1928, 1929 and 1930, and as a three-time winner he permanently kept the trophy that had been presented in 1927. With only a small number of professional in the state, there were only four different winners in the first 15 championships. Stewart won 6 times and McMahon 5 times, while Alf Toogood won twice, before he moved to Tasmania, and Willie Harvey also won twice, in 1938 and 1940. The format changed to match-play in 1937, all matches being over 36 holes. In 1937 and 1938 there were just 8 entries and a straight knock-out format was used. However, there were 9 entries in 1939 and a 36-hole qualifying stage was used to reduce the field to 8. In 1940 the qualifying stage was retained but just four players advanced to the match-play stage. The 1941 event was reduced to a single day, with 36 holes of stroke-play.

The championship resumed in 1946, using the 1940 format with four players qualifying, and this format was retained for a number of years. From 1946 to 1950 only 16 players qualified for the Australian PGA Championship. Each state was allocated a specific number of places and organised their own qualifying event for those places. South Australia was allocated just one place. In 1946 there was a 36-hole qualifying event but from 1947 to 1950 the winner of the South Australian Professional Championship qualified. 

In 1952 there was a dispute between the two finalists, Brian Crafter and Fred Thompson. Crafter won the match at the 38th hole but at the 35th hole he had lifted and dropped his ball away from a staked tree. Thompson objected and the matter was not fully resolved until just before the 1953 event, confirming Crafter as the winner.

Winners

References

Former PGA Tour of Australasia events
Golf tournaments in Australia
Golf in South Australia
Recurring sporting events established in 1927
1927 establishments in Australia